Professor P. Gunasekaran, popularly known as Dr. PGS, Vice-Chancellor, VIT Bhopal University, Madhya Pradesh, was a Senior Professor of Microbiology at Madurai Kamaraj University, Madurai, India. He served as Vice chancellor of Thiruvalluvar University Vellore 2012-2015. He has thirty three years of teaching and research experience in Microbiology, Biotechnology and Genomics.

References 

Indian microbiologists
Living people
Scientists from Madurai
1954 births